Delias nais is a butterfly in the family Pieridae. It was described by Karl Jordan in 1912. It is endemic to New Guinea.

Subspecies
D. n. nais (Mount Goliath, Central Mountains, Irian Jaya: Western & Southern Highland Provinces, Papua New Guinea)
D. n. aegle  Joicey & Talbot, 1922 (Central Highlands, Papua New Guinea)
D. n. beehleri  van Mastrigt 2011 (Foja Mounts, West Papua)
D. n. keysseri  Rothschild, 1925 Rawlinson Mtns, Papua New Guinea
D. n. odilae  Gotts & Ginn, 2004 (Prince Alexander Mountains, Papua New Guinea)

References

External links
Delias at Markku Savela's Lepidoptera and Some Other Life Forms

nais
Butterflies described in 1912
Endemic fauna of New Guinea